Tex Wanganeen is an Australian rules footballer who plays for the Essendon Football Club in the Australian Football League (AFL). He is the son of former Essendon and Port Adelaide player Gavin Wanganeen. He joined the club as a rookie through the pre-season supplemental selection period prior to the 2022 season. He was named as the medical substitute against Brisbane in round two of the 2022 season but was not used. He started the next week against Melbourne, kicking his first goal in the third quarter.

Notes

References

External links

 

 

Essendon Football Club players
2003 births
Living people
Australian rules footballers from Adelaide
Sturt Football Club players
People educated at Prince Alfred College
People educated at Xavier College
Indigenous Australian players of Australian rules football